Killias is a surname. Notable people with the surname include:

Eduard Killias (1829–1891), Swiss physician and naturalist
Martin Killias (born 1948), Swiss criminologist
Ulla Engeberg Killias (1945–1995), Swedish/Swiss painter

See also
Killian